Thomas Branagan (born 1774; died 1843) was an American writer and abolitionist. He was described by English professor Christopher N. Philipps as a "kind of American counterpart to John Newton." In 1953, he was described by Lewis Leary in The Pennsylvania Magazine of History and Biography as "one of America's most prolific authors during the first two decades of the nineteenth century."

Life and work
 

Branagan was born in 1774 in Dublin. During his adolescence, he ran away from home to pursue a career as a sailor. Working on slave ships, he progressed through the ranks and eventually became the overseer of a sugar slave plantation located in Antigua. After converting to Methodism, he became morally opposed to slavery and decided to leave his position to become a preacher. In about 1798, he immigrated to Philadelphia.

Branagan wrote extensively on the topic of the evil of slavery, producing six works on the subject from 1804–1810. Four of these works were volumes of poetry. Avenia, which he published in 1805, was the "first poem of any considerable length" published in America on the subject of the enslavement of African Americans. In or around 1807, he argued that a black settlement should be created in the Louisiana Purchase territories, which would promote emancipation of slaves while "saving white society" from dangers he believed would occur in a biracial society. In total, Branagan published 25 works between 1804–1839. Later in his life, he worked as a watchman. He sent several of his works to American president Thomas Jefferson.

References

1774 births
1843 deaths
19th-century American writers
American abolitionists
Irish emigrants to the United States (before 1923)
Writers from Philadelphia
American Methodists
Methodist abolitionists